Aleksandra Polańska (born 24 September 2000) is a Polish swimmer. She competed in the women's 200 metre freestyle at the 2019 World Aquatics Championships and she did not advance to compete in the semi-finals.

References

External links
 

2000 births
Living people
Place of birth missing (living people)
Polish female freestyle swimmers
21st-century Polish women